The Teaching and Higher Education Act 1998 (c 30) was enacted by the United Kingdom Parliament on 16 July 1998. It enabled universities to charge tuition fees, and established statutory General Teaching Councils (GTC's) for England, Wales and Northern Ireland and the modification the remit of the General Teaching Council for Scotland. The act also made provision for the new system of student loans that were introduced, and introduces paid leave from work for training towards a qualification. The passing of this act repealed the Education (Student Loans) Act 1998, and the sections relating to student finance in the Education Act 1996. The student loans system was later updated in the Higher Education Act 2004.

The Teaching and Higher Education Act is divided into four parts, which can be summarised as follows:

Part one

Chapter One
General Teaching Councils will be established in England, Wales and Northern Ireland
Duty of GTC Scotland towards disabled persons and the representation of Special needs teachers
Teachers at maintained schools in the UK are required to register with their GTC
Teachers must abide by the GTC for England Code of Conduct and the GTC for Wales Code of Conduct

Chapter Two
Headteachers in schools in England and Wales (with some exceptions) must have a professional headship qualification.
This chapter also makes provision for the inspection of teacher training institutions.

Chapter Three
All Newly Qualified Teachers in the England and Wales are required to pass an induction period of three school terms (one school year). At the end of this period the headteacher is required to make a recommendation to the appropriate body as to whether the new teacher has achieved the standards set by the GTC.

Part two
This section outlines, in very broad terms, the system of student loans in the UK. A non-governmental body was set up in 1989 (see Student Loans Company) to administer the awarding and recovery of these loans. The Student Loans Company is not directly mentioned in this section however; the statute only calls for the Secretary of State to administer these loans.

Part Three
An insert to the Employment Rights Act 1996 which states that any employee who is 16 or 17, and not in full-time education, and 'has not attained such standard of achievement as is prescribed by regulations made by the Secretary of State', is entitled to take time off their working hours to undertake training for a qualification.
 'An employee who is permitted to take time off...is entitled to be paid remuneration by his employer for the time taken off at the appropriate hourly rate'

Part Four
Miscellaneous additions, including the re-affirmation that the only educational services in the UK allowed to use the title 'University' are those that are authorised by act of parliament or by Royal Charter, or have been approved by the Privy Council.

See also
UK enterprise law

External links

(detailing the right to paid leave for training)

Education finance in the United Kingdom
Higher education in the United Kingdom
Teaching in the United Kingdom
United Kingdom Acts of Parliament 1998
United Kingdom Education Acts
1998 in education